Antonia Maria de Oviedo Schöntal (16 March 1822 – 28 February 1898) was a Swiss-Spanish Roman Catholic professed religious and the co-founder of the Oblate Sisters of the Most Holy Redeemer, an order that she established with the Benedictine Bishop José María Serra. She assumed the religious name of "Antonia María of Mercy" and worked alongside poor and disadvantaged women.

She was declared Venerable on 7 July 1962 after Pope John XXIII approved the fact that she lived a life of heroic virtue. A miracle needed for her to be beatified all but requires papal approval after having received approval from the Congregation for the Causes of Saints back in 2005.

Early life
Antonia Maria de Oviedo Schöntal was born on 16 March 1822 in Lausanne to the Spanish Antonio de Oviedo and the Swiss Susanna Schöntal. Antonio de Oviedo, native of Sevilla, Spain and Susana Schönthal from Lausanne, Switzerland got married on July 20, 1819. The birth of Antonia María filled with joy the home of the young couple. Few days after, she was  baptized  at the St. Stephen Catholic Chapel and received  the names of Antonia María Victoria Juana.

At the age of 13 she made her first communion in the Church of the Assumption in Lausanne. It was a bittersweet day due to her parents absence. Don Antonio already left for England at that time to ensure the sustenance of the family. After a long illness and accompanied by his wife, Don Antonio passed away in England on June 21, 1935. 

The influence of Susana was crucial in Antonia's education and religious experience. Susana was a woman of exquisite sensitivity, great culture, and deep faith. Antonia received in her childhood and youth a solid preparation in history, culture and geography of her small and beloved country, Switzerland. This will leave a deep mark in her traits and personality. Antonia grew under the loving and attentive gaze of her mother. She studied in a boarding school in Fribourg, where she was praised for her knowledge, excellence in languages and spotless behavior.

As an Educator 
At the age of 16, the Marquis of la Romana entrusted to her the education of his 10-year-old daughter, Rosalia Caro, who later became Duchess of Medina Sidonia. Antonia, worked and lived between Geneva, Milan, and Florence for two years. At that time, due to the precarious situation of her family, she opened a boarding school for young women in Freiburg. But after six years, she was forced to close it due to the war.

After that experience, Antonia received a job offer from the Spanish ambassador in Bern, who requested her services to be the governess of the three daughters of Queen Maria Christina de Borbón  from her marriage to Don Agustin Fernando Muñoz, the Duke of Riánsares. In January 1848, Antonia travelled to Madrid and lived with the royal family and dedicated herself to the education of the three princesses: Amparo, Milagros and Cristina.

For 12 years, she worked as governess to the royal children where she displayed her rich cultural background, exquisite training, special sensitivity to the arts, music, literature, languages and showed her solid faith and personal maturity.  She remained in her position until 1860 when the princesses all left home following their marriages. Her departure came in October 1860 with the marriage of the last daughter: Maria Cristina Muñoz Borbón (19 April 1840 – 19 December 1921).She later moved to Rome, where she remained for two years. Her work and dedication were marked by the spirit of missionary commitment. She was then the Vice President of the apostolic work that supported foreign missions founded by Bishop Jose Benito Serra. Antonia was a woman who had experienced love with great intensity by receiving marriage proposals. But she was free to choose her future and her desire to belong to God whom she dearly loved overpowered her.

As a Writer 
Since she was a child, she had shown interest in  research and books. Between 1836 and 1855, she developed her literary facet and wrote poems, dialogues and comedies, historical and travel pieces, sea stories as well as on eucharistic, ecclesial and missionary themes, novels and autobiographical texts. The following are her literary pieces in its English translations.

Poems 
  Felicitations and Acrostics   (Felicitaciones y Acrósticos -Friburg, 1836-1851)
 Couplets (Coplas - Lausanne, 1844)
 Spiritual: To the cross (A la cruz- Madrid, 1850), Amen (Ciempozuelos, 1896)
 Human values: The refuge of happiness (El refugio de la felicidad -Madrid, 1852), Her name (Su nombre- Rome, 1861)

Dialogues and comedies 
 For a prize distribution (Para una distribución de premios- Friburg, 1845)
 Goodbye (Adiós- Madrid, 1849)
 The party or The magic mirror (La fiesta o El espejo mágico- Madrid, 1850)

Historical and travel writings 
 Recollections of London (Recuerdos de Londres-London, 1853)
 An excursion to Toledo (Una excursión a Toledo- Aranjuez, 1853)
 The Emperor's bench (El banco del Emperador - Aranjuez, 1853)
 Switzerland at the edge of the lake (Suiza al borde del lago-Switzerland, 1853)
 A visit to Rueil (Una visita a Rueil -La Ma lmaison, 1855)
 Memories of Switzerland (Recuerdos de Suiza- Switzerland, 1857–58)
 Memories and paintings (Recuerdos y cuadros- La Malmaison, 1857)

Marian themes 
 A Dream (Un sueño- Friburg, 1847)
 The Immaculate Conception (La Inmaculada Concepción- La Malmaison, 1854)
 New month of Mary (Nuevo mes de María- La Malmaison, 1855)
 The Assumption (La Asunción- La Malmaison, 1857)
 The wonders of the nineteenth century (Las maravillas del siglo XIX - Madrid, 1885)

Eucharistic themes 
 Month of the Blessed Sacrament (Mes del Santísimo Sacramento - La Malmaison, 1855)
 Feast of Corpus in Rueil (Fiesta del Corpus en Rueil- La Malmaison, 1855)

Ecclesial-missionary themes 
 The feast of the Kings in the Propaganda School (La fiesta de los Reyes en el Colegio de Propaganda -Rome, 1858)
 Vidimus stellam (Rome, 1861)
 Christmas Party in Rome (Fiesta de Navidad en Roma - Rome, 1860)
 Miscellaneous writings on Rome (Escritos diversos sobre Roma- Rome, 1861)
 The Missionary (El Misionero - Rome, 1862)
 The field of Aníbal and the General Council of 1869 (El campo de Aníbal y el Concilio general de 1869- Ciempozuelos, 1869)
 Letter to the Pope (Carta al papa - Madrid, 1868 and 1871)

Novels 
 The Rose of Magdalena (El Rosal de Magdalena - La Malmaison, 1858)
 Aurelius... (Aurelio - Rome, 1859)

Autobiographies

History of a conscience ( Historia de una conciencia-Bagnères de Bigorre, 1854)

A Memory of Bliss (Un recuerdo de dicha - Parías, 1855)

Rule of Life ( Regla de Vida- 1838) 
In 1938, Antonia Maria wrote her Rule of Life.  Below is the English translation of this rule that she drafted.

With the desire to put into practice the teachings, warnings, and examples that I have received until today, I propose before starting a new lifestyle, never to separate myself from the path of virtue, of religion, turn to Jesus and Mary in all situations, however difficult they may be, to obtain from their sacred hearts, the consolations and strength I need.

For this, I made the firm resolution to faithfully follow the rule of life that I have drawn for myself in order not to live, if not for God, to inspire the girl that will entrust me with these same feelings even amid this world.

With the grace of God, I promise:

1.      When I wake up each morning, to offer Jesus and to His Blessed Mother, my thoughts, words and deeds and ask them for the grace to fulfill my duties well during the day.

2.      Once on my feet, kneel before the crucifix and after the morning prayer, dedicate time for meditation followed by a short foresight test.

3.      Attend Holy Mass every day unless there is a real obstacle.

4.      Do a pious reading every day if you cannot do it during the day, I will do it before going to bed.

5.      Conclude the day devoutly reciting the night prayers, examining my conscience in a special way on the duties of my status.

6.      If the confessor allows me,  go to confession and take communion every Sunday and if possible, during feast days. During trips in Protestant countries, never spend a month not receiving the sacraments and not strengthening my soul with the divine Eucharist.

7.      The last Sunday of each month is dedicated to the Good Death Association, to which I belong. I want to spend it with greater recollection, devoting more time to the exercises of piety, examining my behavior during that month to better understand the state of my soul.  I will notice some special progress I will thank God. If, on the contrary, I am careless in the performance of my duties, I will ask the Lord for forgiveness. I will resolve to watch myself more, begging God to help me with his divine grace.

8.      Once a year during Advent or Christmas, I will make 2 or 3 days of spiritual retreat to delve into myself and thoroughly examine my soul, so that I can give an account to my director, if he deems it convenient. I will spend these days in recollection trying to avoid everything that could distract me.

9.      I also take the firm resolution to never lose the opportunity to instill religious and moral values in the heart of my young student, to instill in her solid principles, the basis of all Christian education.

Grant me, my God, the grace to faithfully follow the resolutions that I have just made. Bless them and make me live only for you with you and in you. Grant me love for my duties, that I do not deviate me even to the of its fulfillment and that the feelings that the ladies of Martange engraved in my heart will never be erased.

As Foundress 
In her former work as governess in the Palace, she had met the Benedictine Bishop José María Benito Serra (11 May 1810 – 8 September 1886) who served as the Bishop of Perth in Australia. In 1862 he had submitted his resignation to Pope Pius IX and assumed residence in Madrid. He later became her spiritual director and was a guest in March 1863 of Schöntal and her paternal aunt at Las Avellanas; the Redemptorist priest Loyodice was another guest.

In the spring of 1864, Antonia met again with Bishop Jose Maria Benito Serra who presented to her his unexpected dream to work with women seeking alternative life while working in prostitution. At first, she felt stunned and expressed her resistance to a project that is not considered suitable for any of them. After a while, she began to see their plight and offered financial resources to help Serra tend to these women. But her faith, sensitivity and character led her to mature with the mission proposal. Later, she felt the voice of God whom she always searched, that told her to take off her shoes of fears and resistance. Antonia then went out to the street, listened to the women saying: "I do not have anyone in the world", she prayed, discerned, and finally visited Our Lady of Good Counsel in the cathedral of Saint Isidore, where she decided to accept and commit herself to the project.

On June 1, 1864, in Ciempozuelos, Madrid together with Bishop Serra, they opened the first mission house, a place of welcome and hope for women. On 7 June 1864 the first women came into the home: one who was Spanish and another who was French. Pope Leo XIII would later call their work, "not only a work of charity but a work of redemption".

On February 1870, she took her religious habit and became the first Oblate Sister of the Most Holy Redeemer. She took the name of Antonia Maria of Mercy, an expression of the new charism that led her to express herself before the reality of the women: "I want you to see in them the image of the Redeemer"

For 34 long years, Antonia walked with women in prostitution, a way of liberating evangelization and feels so identified with her call that she expressed: "I'm happy and sure that God called me to this work, so peaceful in my vocation, that my only desire is to be faithful"..

Her death 
In the night of February 28, 1898,  Antonia Maria of Mercy at 75 years old gave up her life in total oblation to the Father and after living fully the mystery of mercy and been place of Encounter with Life for so many women who opened themselves to hope. Her mortal remains rest in the Chapel of the  Spirituality House of the Oblate Sisters of the Most Holy Redeemer in Ciempozuelos, Madrid, Spain. The fame of holiness that accompanied Antonia when she was still alive after death takes root and begins to spread and propagate for the graces and favors that God grants through her intercession.

Beatification process 
The process of beatification started in the Archdiocese of Madrid with an informative process that commenced on 23 November 1927 and concluded in 1932. Her writings received the approval of theologians on 2 August 1942 who deemed that the writings she left behind were indeed in line with the magisterium of the Christian faith. The formal introduction of the cause came on 1 February 1948, under Pope Pius XII, in which she was accorded the title of Servant of God as the first official stage in the process despite the previous actions the cause undertook.

An apostolic process was held in 1952 in order to continue the work of the informative process while the two processes received the validation of officials from the Congregation of Rites on 11 March 1955; this would allow for them to commence their own line of investigation into the merits of the cause.

She was proclaimed to be Venerable on 7 July 1962 after Pope John XXIII confirmed that the late religious had lived a model life of heroic virtue.

The miracle required for her beatification was investigated in Spain and received validation from the Congregation for the Causes of Saints on 26 April 1991. The medical board based in Rome approved the miracle on 24 October 2002 while theologians approved it on 15 April 2005; the C.C.S. granted their final approval on 6 December 2005.

The miracle now requires papal approval for the beatification to take place.

Virtual Chapel 
Those who wish to pray with Antonia Maria and ask for her intercession can visit the Virtual Chapel by clicking this link

Prayer to Obtain Favors 
Blessed be our God, incarnate in history, who through the power of the Spirit

has entered the heart of the world, and in Jesus you reveal yourself as a God rich in mercy.

Today, we remember the Venerable Mother Antonia Maria de la Misericordia,

who was a gesture of great humanity for her participation in the Redemptive Work of Christ.

She felt your call and shared the Good News of the gospel to women in the contexts of prostitution,

and creating horizons of dignity and hope together. We ask you, through the intercession of Mother Antonia,

to listen to our pleas (say your intentions)...

Venerable Mother Antonia, intercede for us with the Lord.

Bicentennial of her birth  ( 1822-2022) 
On March 16, 2022, the Oblate Sisters of the Most Holy Redeemer in the places where they are commemorated the Bicentennial of the birth of Mother Antonia Maria of Mercy. It kicked off with the Virtual Bicentennial Jubilee Year Celebration on March 9, 2022, the Feast of St. Joseph, that was attended by over 200 members of the Congregation and the whole Oblate Family all over the world.

As thanksgiving and remembrance of the life and legacy of  Mother Antonia, this Jubilee Year will be guided with the slogan " She lived what she believed. Proclaimed what she lived." The Bicentennial Commission has prepared  various activities for this year until its culmination on March 16, 2021. Among these activities are the Short Video Contest "200 years with Antonia María de Oviedo"  the production of film about Mother Antonia entitled, "Si Todas Las Puertas Se Cierran" ( If All The Doors Are Closed).

The opening of the Bicentennial despite being virtual was celebrated in a very festive way. From Angola to the Philippines, expressions of joy of the participants were vividly seen on the screens. The Superior General of the Oblate Sisters of the Most Holy Redeemer, Lourdes Perramon Bacardit, opened the celebration with few words of welcome and thanksgiving. In her welcome address inspired by the slogan of the celebration, she pointed out three beliefs held by Mother Antonia: "Her  belief in God" expressed in her living out with great depth in all the significant steps in her life of faith, "belief in the women" with a " pedagogical and evangelical perspective" that allowed her to "establish the pedagogy of love" and "belief in the project she started" and in those who, together with her and Serra, promoted  that which "configured her entire life."

Marissa Cotolí, the Vice -postulator in the beatification cause of Antonia María de la Misericordia and member of the Bicentennial Commission walked through with the participants the life and works of Mother Antonia by showing  some original graphic illustrations.  Afterwards, the three winners of the Short Film Contest on the life and mission of Antonia were announced: the first prize went to the short entitled, "Una vida, un sueño que aún hoy se hacen realidad" (A life, a dream that still comes true today), produced by the Colegio Santísimo Redentor, in Ramos Mejia, Argentina.

The Commission received a total of 29 videos from Angola, Italy, Colombia, Brazil, Portugal, Argentina and Spain. The ten best videos can be found in the  YouTube channel: Oblate Sisters – Communication.

As a climax to the celebration of the Oblate Family, we were able to enjoy two wonderful dances performed by women from the project in Angola and from the formation community in the Philippines.

Film: If all the doors are closed ("Si todas las puertas se cierran”) 
Synopsis

If all doors are closed” tells the story of three women, apparently separated in time and space, but who end up coming together in their process of finding themselves. The three will have to listen to an inner call that requires them to face their fears and be the true protagonists of their lives, opening new paths of transformation and liberation.

One of them, of course, is the Founding Mother, Antonia María de Oviedo y Schönthal (1822-1898.). The film tries to focus on the most significant parts of her life, many of them narrated by herself, with "flashback" or "jump back". It will be her encounters with Father José María Benito Serra and her incessant search for the truth and her personal mission, which will mark a before and after in her life process, making the decision to give her life to the care of women who practice prostitution.

The other two protagonists are current figures: Rebeca, 25, and Sharik, 27. Rebeca lives in Madrid and works as a teacher in a private school while she is studying for the public exams to secure a permanent position. She has been with her partner, Enrique, for a few years, but she still does not feel motivated to commit to him and give her relationship more stability. In her work, she observes and cares about her students and that leads her to get involved in the life of families, beyond the school. This is what happens to him with Alika, a 6-year-old student with an African mother, who leads him into a world unknown to her: that of Prostitution and Human Trafficking. Her encounter with that sad reality awakens questions that she had never asked herself before and makes her rethink the course of her life.

Sharik, just a teenager, is sold by her father to a man much older than her. She is transferred to Spain to be prostituted and as a commodity she is abused by many men. Pregnant with her pimp, she receives more favorable treatment from him, taking her off the street and putting her to serve drinks at her club.

But the life of this Nigerian is full of darkness and restlessness. She will be her daughter and her desire to transform her sad reality, her engine that gives her strength and determination to become the brave and independent woman she wants to be. I meet her with Rebeca, her daughter's teacher and later, with the Congregation of Oblate Sisters, they give her the key to embark on this new path of empowerment.

References

External list
Hagiography Circle

1822 births
1898 deaths
19th-century venerated Christians
19th-century Swiss people
Founders of Catholic religious communities
People from Lausanne
Swiss Roman Catholics
Venerated Catholics